This is a list of Superfund sites in Illinois designated under the Comprehensive Environmental Response, Compensation, and Liability Act (CERCLA) environmental law.  These sites are listed on the National Priorities List. 13 Sites are listed below.

Superfund sites

See also
List of Superfund sites in the United States
List of environmental issues
List of waste types
TOXMAP

References

External links
EPA list of proposed Superfund sites in Illinois
EPA list of current Superfund sites in Illinois
EPA list of Superfund site construction completions in Illinois
EPA list of partially deleted Superfund sites in Illinois
EPA list of deleted Superfund sites in Illinois

Superfund
Superfund
Illinois